Porpoise Subglacial Highlands is a group of subglacial highlands to the west of Astrolabe Subglacial Basin, in the east part of Wilkes Land. The feature was delineated by the Scott Polar Research Institute (SPRI)-National Science Foundation (NSF)-Technical University of Denmark (TUD) airborne radio echo sounding program, 1967–79, and named after the Porpoise (Lieutenant C. Ringgold, USN), one of the ships of the United States Exploring Expedition, 1838-42 (Lieutenant Charles Wilkes, USN).

Plateaus of Antarctica
Landforms of Wilkes Land
Highlands